Surprise was a steamboat which operated on the upper Willamette River from 1857 to 1864.

Construction
Surprise was built in 1857 at Canemah, Oregon by Cochrane, Cassidy & Gibson, who had built the James Clinton the year before. The beam was  feet and the depth of hold was   feet. The steamer’s registered size was 120 tons, a measure of size, not weight.

Engineering 

Operations 
Surprise was operated on the upper Willamette River by Capt. Theodore T. Wygant. Other partners in the boat were Absalom F. Hedges, Oregon City merchant, William. C. Dement & Co., Charles C. Felton, J. Harding, and Robert Patton.  
In April 1858, Surprise transported the native American leader Tecumtum, also known as Old John, to Fort Vancouver where he was to be held in custody.

As of November 1, 1859, Surprise was running under the control of the Upper Willamette Transportation Line.  Other boats controlled by the line were Onward, Elk, and Relief.  In December 1859, the line advertised that one of its four boats would leave Canemeh for Corvallis, Oregon twice a week, and for Eugene City once a week, with freight and passage “at the usual rates.”  Theodore Wygant (b.1831) was the Oregon City agent for the line.

Disposition 
Surprise operated on the upper Willamette until 1864 when it was dismantled and the engines installed in a new steamer, Senator.

Notes

References

Printed sources

Newspaper collections
 

People's Transportation Company
Steamboats of the Willamette River
Ships built in Canemah, Oregon